Halla is a populated area, a socken (not to be confused with parish), on the Swedish island of Gotland. It comprises the same area as the administrative Halla District, established on 1January 2016.

Geography 
Halla is situated in central Gotland. The medieval Halla Church is located in the socken. , Halla Church belongs to Vänge parish in Romaklosters pastorat, along with the churches in Vänge, Buttle, Guldrupe, Sjonhem and Viklau.

History 
In 1904, the Broe helmet (RAÄ number Halla 48:1) was found in a cremation grave at Broe farm, Högbro in Halla. It is a decorated Vendel iron helmet, of which only fragments remain.

References

External links 

Objects from Halla at the Digital Museum by Nordic Museum

Populated places in Gotland County